Linda gracilicornis is a species of beetle in the family Cerambycidae. It was described by Maurice Pic in 1907.

Varietas
 Linda gracilicornis var. rufofemorata Breuning, 1954
 Linda gracilicornis var. tatsienlui Breuning, 1954

References

gracilicornis
Beetles described in 1907